The following elections occurred in the year 1842.

 1842 French legislative election
 1842 Newfoundland general election

North America

Canada
 1842 Newfoundland general election

United States
 1842 Illinois gubernatorial election
 1842 New York gubernatorial election
 1842 and 1843 United States House of Representatives elections
 1842 and 1843 United States Senate elections

See also
 :Category:1842 elections

1842
Elections